Andrew "Andy" Yohe (born July 21, 1978) is an ice sled hockey player from United States. Yohe was team captain at the 2010 Winter Paralympics in Vancouver, where the USA defeated Japan by a 2-0 tally to win the gold medal. 
 
Yohe was a competitive roller hockey player for the Bettendorf (Iowa) Young Guns. In September 1994, he lost both legs in an accident, in which he was run over while trying to jump onto a train. From 2003 to 2009, Yohe was a member of the Rehabilitation Institute of Chicago Blackhawks Sled Hockey club.

References

External links
 
 
  (2010 & 2014)
  (2006)

1978 births
Living people
American sledge hockey players
Paralympic sledge hockey players of the United States
Paralympic gold medalists for the United States
Paralympic bronze medalists for the United States
Ice sledge hockey players at the 2006 Winter Paralympics
Ice sledge hockey players at the 2010 Winter Paralympics
Ice sledge hockey players at the 2014 Winter Paralympics
Medalists at the 2006 Winter Paralympics
Medalists at the 2010 Winter Paralympics
Medalists at the 2014 Winter Paralympics
Paralympic medalists in sledge hockey